The Sault Symphony Orchestra is a Canadian/American orchestra headquartered in Sault Ste. Marie, Ontario, Canada.  Its primary performance venues include the Kiwanis Community Theatre Centre and Central United Church in Sault Ste. Marie, Ontario, and St. Mary's Pro-Cathedral and the Soo Theatre in Sault Ste. Marie, Michigan. An average concert season consists of 4 to 6 concerts, plus a year-end fundraising event called “Beer, Bratwurst and Beethoven”. The Music Director and Conductor of the Sault Symphony is John Wilkinson.

History 
The Sault Symphony Orchestra first was formed in 1956 as the Sault Symphonette by Don Buchan, Ed Shrubsole, and Ed and Katherine Gartshore, among others. With support from Algoma Steel, the Symphonette gave live concerts and radio broadcasts. Don Buchan, and later James Whicher, conducted. In 1969, the group was renamed the Sault Symphony and was directed by Lajos Bornyi. Within four years, the group had a Board of Directors and had joined the Ontario Federation of Symphony Orchestras as the 25th symphony orchestra in the province.

In the mid-1970s, several important steps were taken by the growing Orchestra and the group emerged stronger than ever. It was renamed the Sault Ste. Marie International Association, to reflect the increasing presence of players from both sides of the border. At a later date, the official name of the organization
was changed to Sault Symphony Association. A partnership with the Sudbury Symphony was developed.  There were several joint concerts and the semi-regular participation of musicians from one orchestra to the other. Dr. John Wilkinson was appointed Music Director and Conductor in December 1977 and still serves in this capacity today.

During the 1980s, the Sault Symphony sponsored a string quartet thanks to generous support from the Ontario Arts Council and Algoma Steel Corporation. In 1989, the Sault Symphony Association and the Conservatory at Algoma University established a CORE musicians program, with funding from the Ontario Arts Council. Two of these CORE musicians continue to work for the Sault Symphony today: Anya Mallinger (concertmaster) and Bernadette Merritt (principal cellist); they hold sectionals and do outreach at various schools, as well as play in the Orchestra. Anya Mallinger has served as concertmaster of the Sault Symphony since 1995.

The Sault Symphony Orchestra continues to work at providing varied and exciting programs, often with internationally recognized soloists. Its continued existence is a tribute to the hard work of Board members, volunteers, musicians, and the support of its audiences.

Governance 
The Board of Directors of the Sault Symphony Association governs the Sault Symphony Orchestra. The President is Angela Rasaiah, Al Beamish serves as Vice-President.  Heather Myers is Treasurer, and the Secretary is Gudrun Schatzler.

Sault Symphony School of Music

History 
The Sault Symphony School of Music was established by the Symphony in 1997, when a joint venture with Lake Superior State University allowed the Symphony to relocate world-renowned violinist, Oleg Pokhanovski, and his brother, Mikhail, an accomplished violist, to Sault Ste. Marie.

The faculty of the School expanded over the years and eventually included nine instructors.  Services were offered to children of all ages in guitar, violin, viola, cello, piano, voice, woodwinds, brass instruments, theory, harmony, and history. Many partnerships were forged through the School of Music allowing the Symphony to take innovative approaches to the music education of the youth in this community.

Programs of the Sault Symphony School of Music 
 Children With Special Needs
 Young Artists' Concerto Competition
 Stepping Stones
 Magic, Mirth, and Music

1. The School of Music provided a music program for children with special needs. In its years of operation, this program consisted of twelve students, who were able to choose violin, cello, guitar, viola, piano, or voice. The fees were donated by the Symphony with support from outside groups. A student recital was held every year to showcase the talents of such special artists.

2. For the last ten years, the Sault Symphony has sponsored a Young Artists’ Concerto Competition, which is open to all orchestral instrumentalists, piano, and voice students, up to 20 years of age. One local and two out-of-town adjudicators judge the performances.  Contestants must be living or studying in the Algoma District or Michigan’s Tri-County area of Michigan's upper peninsula.. First prize includes the opportunity to perform with the Sault Symphony Orchestra in one of its regular season concerts, as well as scholarships for the other place-winners.

3. Stepping Stones was created to provide musical instruction to pre-school children between the ages of 1 and 5. Stepping Stones was designed specifically to appeal to young children and teach them about musical instruments and theory, using a variety of interactive lessons, videos, and actual musical instruments that are safe for children to handle. With a maximum of 8 children per session, Stepping Stones offered personalized instruction.

4. The Youth Education and Outreach Program of the Sault Symphony School of Music introduced this program in 2007-2008 school year. Through the program, visits by music teachers and orchestra members are made to the local elementary schools to present interactive sessions of music instruction. These sessions involve live performances, the handling of musical instruments, audio-visual presentations, art projects, evaluation tools, and occasional guest musicians. Ontario Curriculum-based follow-up lesson suggestions and materials are provided to the classroom teachers.

The Symphony School of Music ceased operation in 2012 when the Symphony offices were moved to smaller quarters. The Youth Education and Outreach Program continues to function and the Young Artist Concerto

The competition is held every other year.

See also
 List of symphony orchestras
 Canadian classical music

External links
 Sault Symphony Orchestra Website

References

Canadian orchestras
Musical groups established in 1956
1956 establishments in Ontario
Musical groups from Sault Ste. Marie, Ontario